Livestreaming e-commerce in China (also known as live commerce or livestream shopping) was initiated by fashion e-commerce platform Mogujie in 2016. In the same year, it was picked up and gradually made popular by Alibaba, who turned live commerce into a fixture in its annual Singles' Day shopping festivals.

Market size in China 
After a three-year development period between 2016 and 2018, China’s livestreaming e-commerce industry became popular in 2019. Today, it is a well-established ecosystem which in 2020 counted over 8,800 companies and 1.23 million live hosts, known in China as Key Opinion Leaders (KOLs), according to Shanghai-based new retail research firm iResearch. In 2020, the top two KOL, Austin Li and Viya, alone, sold 9.1 Million RMB in Alibaba's Single's Day pre-sale. 

According to the 47th Statistical Report on China’s Internet Development, released in February 2021 by China Internet Network Information Center (CNNIC), the number of livestream e-commerce users was 388 million by 2020, accounting for roughly 40% of the Chinese internet population.

The industry exceeded the one-trillion RMB threshold by the end of 2020, according to KPMG and AliResearch. While the growth of the sector is diminishing year after year, China’s live commerce market is forecast to continue growing. From 31 March 2020 to 31 March 2021, GMV on Taobao Live was 6.7% of the total transaction volume for Alibaba’s online marketplaces in China. In 2020, live commerce accounted for 10.6% of the country’s total online retail market.

Chinese platforms for live commerce 
The main Chinese platforms for live commerce are, according to Pandaily:  
 Taobao Live – the live streaming platform of Alibaba’s B2C platform Taobao, one of the earliest adopters of live e-commerce in China.
 Kuaishou – a mobile app for short videos, particularly popular among the lower tier cities and rural areas.
 Douyin – the short-video platform owned by ByteDance and famous outside of China as TikTok.

Multi-channel networks in China 
Besides the livestream platforms, the growth of the industry is fueled by multi-channel networks (MCNs), companies who incubate live streamers, or KOLs, and connect them with brands and end-users. MCN plays two critical roles. On the one hand, MCNs are training live streamers and acting as a communication bridge between merchants and live streamers. Based on the merchant's product information, the MCN selects the suitable live streamers they have trained to prepare for live streaming sales to sell their products. In addition, the MCN will negotiate details with the merchant on behalf of the live streamer, such as deposits, commissions, and products to be sold. Most MNCs have one leading KOL in the founding team or as the main source of revenue, and tend to work with one platform. Among the most famous MNCs in China are, according to TechNode:

Regulatory interventions 

In March 2021, the State Administration for Market Regulation introduced new rules targeting the development of the livestreaming e-commerce sector, giving platforms and merchants more responsibilities and addressing concerns linked to user data privacy and forced exclusivity.

In August 2021, China’s Ministry of Commerce introduced new industry standards for livestream commerce, detailing how hosts should dress or speak during the live broadcasts, as well as setting guidelines for hosts and products reviews.

References 

E-commerce in China
Streaming